Maricarmen Arrigorriaga Aguirre (born 1957 in Santiago) is a popular Chilean film and soap opera  actress.

Biography

She is the daughter of parents of origin Basque and has nine siblings. His training was in the Colegio Universitario Inglés and then at school Divina Pastora. Later he graduated to the School of Theatre in the University of Chile, but in the latter could not finish his studies because he was abrutamente sent to Europe before the eyes of their parents for personal reasons. Eight months later he returned to Chile, during that time also tried to graduating from the University several times, but finally gave up.

Maricarmen marriage contracted in 1985 with TV director Christian Mason to whom he was married five years, finally in a tough year separate.

Career
It debuted at television when he was just starting the soap, replacing an actress with an antagonistic role on the daytime drama Casagrande on television Canal 13. His debut was an emergency, but he used to enter the area of the channel dramatically manduvo where for ten years. In 1992 at the end of El Palo al Gato, the TV director Óscar Rodriguez tells you that there were no papers for her and eventually migrates to the chain TV TVN debut on the hit daytime drama Amame. Parallel debut in film with the film Amnesia directed by Gonzalo Justiniano and Valparaíso directed by Mariano Andrade.

In Televisión Nacional de Chile remained another ten years, and participated in several dramatic productions, in which stands ( Rojo y Miel, Oro Verde, Aquelarre, Santoladrón and in addition to two sets).

In 2003, returns to television Canal 13 to participate in the successful production Machos. Keep in entering the field of several dramatic productions until 2007, where it is part of another successful production Lola, whose character just kept in the first stage and then was taken by another actress. In 2008 returned to the area's dramatic TVN led by Maria Eugenia Rencoret and is involved in the successful production Hijos del Monte.

Filmography

 Amnesia (1994)
 Valparaíso (1994)
 Tuve un Sueño Contigo (1999) – Luisa
 Te Amo (made in Chile) (2001) – Isabel's mother
 Tres Noches de un Sábado (2002) – Amanda
 Fiesta Patria (2006) – Irma
 El Brindis (2007) – Sofía

References

External links

1957 births
Living people
Chilean people of Basque descent
Chilean television actresses
Chilean film actresses
Chilean telenovela actresses
Actresses from Santiago
University of Chile alumni